In Greek mythology, Odius (Ancient Greek: Ὀδίος or Ὀδίον) may refer to the following personages:

 Odius, leader of the Alizonians from Alybe (Chalybes or Alope) together with his brother Epistrophus. They were children of Mecisteus. Agamemnon thrust Odius from his chariot and killed him with a spear which was fixed in his back between the shoulders. The lance was driven through his breast by the Mycenaean king causing Odius to fell with a thud and his armour clanged.
 Odius, a herald who attended those who tried to persuade Achilles to start fighting again.

Notes

References 

 Apollodorus, The Library with an English Translation by Sir James George Frazer, F.B.A., F.R.S. in 2 Volumes, Cambridge, MA, Harvard University Press; London, William Heinemann Ltd. 1921. ISBN 0-674-99135-4. Online version at the Perseus Digital Library. Greek text available from the same website.
 Homer, The Iliad with an English Translation by A.T. Murray, Ph.D. in two volumes. Cambridge, MA., Harvard University Press; London, William Heinemann, Ltd. 1924. . Online version at the Perseus Digital Library.
 Homer, Homeri Opera in five volumes. Oxford, Oxford University Press. 1920. . Greek text available at the Perseus Digital Library.
 Strabo, The Geography of Strabo. Edition by H.L. Jones. Cambridge, Mass.: Harvard University Press; London: William Heinemann, Ltd. 1924. Online version at the Perseus Digital Library.
 Strabo, Geographica edited by A. Meineke. Leipzig: Teubner. 1877. Greek text available at the Perseus Digital Library.

Characters in the Iliad